Rapla Parish is an Estonian municipality located in Rapla County. It has a population of 13,193 (as of 1 January 2019) and an area of 859 km2.

Settlements
Town
Rapla
Small boroughs
Alu - Hagudi - Kaiu - Kuusiku
Villages
Äherdi - Alu-Metsküla - Aranküla - Atla - Hagudi - Helda - Hõreda - Iira - Jalase - Jaluse - Järlepa - Juula - Juuru - Kabala - Kaigepere - Kalda - Kalevi - Karitsa - Kasvandu - Kelba - Keo - Kodila - Kodila-Metsküla - Koigi - Koikse - Kõrgu - Kuimetsa - Kuku - Kuusiku-Nõmme - Lipa - Lipametsa - Lipstu - Loe - Lõiuse - Lõpemetsa - Mahlamäe - Mahtra - Maidla - Mällu - Metsküla - Mõisaaseme - Nõmme - Nõmmemetsa - Nõmmküla - Oblu - Oela - Ohulepa - Oola - Orguse - Palamulla - Pirgu - Põlliku - Põlma - Purila - Purku - Raela - Raikküla - Raka - Ridaküla - Röa - Sadala - Seli - Seli-Nurme - Sikeldi - Sulupere - Suurekivi - Tamsi - Tapupere - Tolla - Toomja - Tõrma - Tuti - Ülejõe - Ummaru - Uusküla - Vahakõnnu - Vahastu - Väljataguse - Valli - Valtu - Vana-Kaiu - Vankse - Vaopere

Religion

International relations

Twin towns — Sister cities
 Nurmijärvi, Finland

References

External links